Lugovi is a small village near populated village Mladoševica in the municipalities of Teslić (Republika Srpska) and Maglaj, Zenica-Doboj Canton, Federation of Bosnia and Herzegovina, Bosnia and Herzegovina. It is located where river  is merging with it tributary Kućetinska Rijeka.

Demographics 
According to the 2013 census, its population was 14, all living in the Teslić part thus none in the Maglaj part.

References

Populated places in Teslić
Populated places in Maglaj